Joe Stork is an American political activist and Deputy Director for Middle East and North Africa at Human Rights Watch. He holds an M.A. in International Affairs/Middle East Studies from Columbia University.

Career
Before joining Human Rights Watch in 1996, Stork co-founded the Middle East Research & Information Project (MERIP) in 1971 and was chief editor of its flagship publication, the Middle East Report, until 1995. Stork served as a Peace Corps volunteer in Turkey. "He presently serves as chair of the Middle East Studies Association's Committee on Academic Freedom and sits on the advisory committees of the American Friends Service Committee, Foreign Policy in Focus and the Iraq Revenue Watch project of the Open Society Institute."

Stork's involvement with MERIP and anti-Israel activism before joining HRW have made him the object of criticism. Maariv reported that Stork was a "radical leftist" in the 1970s. According to Maariv'''s report, Stork wrote an article praising the Munich massacre and attended an anti-Zionist conference hosted by Saddam Hussein in 1976. Kenneth Roth, executive director of HRW, has defended Stork by saying that these events took place thirty years ago, and he later became a staunch critic of Hussein.

Books and other publications
 Erased in a Moment: Suicide Bombing Attacks Against Israeli Civilians, Human Rights Watch, 2002.  
 (with Joel Beinin, eds.) Political Islam: A Reader, I.B. Tauris, 1996. 
 (with Joel Beinin, eds.) Political Islam: Essays from "Middle East Report", University of California Press, 1996. 
 Middle East Oil and the Energy Crisis'', Monthly Review Press, 1975

References

Year of birth missing (living people)
American human rights activists
Human Rights Watch people
Peace Corps volunteers
Living people
School of International and Public Affairs, Columbia University alumni
Anti-Zionism in the United States